The 1993-94 season, was the Guildford Flames second year of Ice Hockey. They competed in the British League Division One South. They played in front of the fifth best average home attendance (1,977) in Britain.

The Guildford Flames made history when Great Britain netminder Gillian Barton dress as a back-up netminder. Although she didn't ice she became the first female to be on a British League men’s team.

Standings

British League Division One North

British League Division One South

Player statistics

Netminders

Results

Pre-Season

British League Division One

Autumn Trophy 
The Autumn Trophy was competed for by all the British League teams who did not qualify for the Benson & Hedges Cup. Guildford was eliminated at the Quarter-Final stage losing to the Lee Valley Lions.

Guildford had enjoyed a comfortable 10-3 win over the Lee Valley Lions in the first leg of their Quarter-Final, and travelled for the second leg on New Year's Day, just 48 hours after losing to the Lions in a league fixture.

It seemed as though the Lions had an impossible task ahead of them, but they capitalised on the Flames' netminding problems. Danny Thompson was away on GB under 21 duty, and back-up Mike Shead was injured.

Lee Valley won by the seven-goal margin they needed and the match was tied at 16-16 on aggregate. Nobody seemed to know what to do in the event of an aggregate tie, and there was no overtime and no penalty shots. Eventually, the match was replayed, and Lee Valley came out on top.

External links 
 Official Guildford Flames website

References 
 

Guildford Flames seasons
Gui